Totnes Signal Box is a Grade II listed former Great Western Railway signal box, located on Totnes railway station. It presently functions as a cafe.

Background
The signals at Totnes railway station were initially controlled by "policemen" who walked to each signal to change it. In 1894 they were controlled from a wooden signal box at the west end of the westbound platform.

Operations
In 1923 the current structure was built to the standard blue brick-built GWR design, located towards the opposite end of the eastbound platform. From 17 December 1973 under British Railways it was downgraded to a "fringe box" to the Panel Signal Box at Plymouth railway station, when the signal boxes at Brent and other intermediate locations were closed. The signal box was closed on 9 November 1987, when new multiple-aspect signals were brought into use, controlled from the new signalling centre at Exeter.

Present
Now used as a café, it was one of 26 "highly distinctive" signal boxes listed by Ed Davey, minister for the Department for Culture, Media and Sport in July 2013, in a joint initiative by English Heritage and Network Rail to preserve and provide a window into how railways were operated in the past.

References

Buildings and structures completed in 1923
Totnes
Rail transport in Devon
Great Western Railway
Grade II listed buildings in Devon
Signal boxes in the United Kingdom